Maynaguri College, established in 1999, is general degree college in Maynaguri. It is in Jalpaiguri district. It offers undergraduate courses in arts. It is affiliated to  University of North Bengal.

Departments

Department of Bengali
Department of English
Department of History
Department of Geography
Department of Political Science
Department of Economics
Department of Sanskrit
Department of Physical Education

Accreditation
The college is recognised by the University Grants Commission (UGC).

See also

References

External links
Maynaguri College
University of North Bengal
University Grants Commission
National Assessment and Accreditation Council

Colleges affiliated to University of North Bengal
Educational institutions established in 1999
Universities and colleges in Jalpaiguri district
1999 establishments in West Bengal